Romeo ( 2003 – 2009) was a black wolf who lived in the Mendenhall Valley, near Juneau, Alaska. He was known for his friendly interactions with dogs and people.

Summary
Romeo was an Alexander Archipelago wolf (Canis lupus ligoni, a type of gray wolf) who lived around Mendenhall Glacier between 2003 and 2009. He interacted more or less successfully with locals, tourists, cross-country skiers, and their dogs for six years up until he was killed by poachers.

Books about Romeo
 Romeo, The Story of an Alaskan Wolf, John Hyde, Bunker Hill Publishing, 2010, 
 The Glacier Wolf - True Stories of Life in Southeast Alaska, Nick Jans, Arctic Images, 2009, 
Nick Jans, A Wolf Called Romeo, Mariner Books (March 17, 2015), trade paperback, 288 pages, 
Deb Vanasse (Author), Nancy Slagle (Illustrator), Black Wolf of the Glacier: Alaska's Romeo,

See also
List of wolves
 Other killings of popular wild animals by hunters:
 Pedals (bear)
 Cecil the lion
 Vince (rhinoceros)

References

Wolves in the United States
Individual wolves
Individual wild animals
2000s animal births
2009 animal deaths